Vieq (also Romanized as Vīeq; also known as  Vīyeh) is a village in Dodangeh Rural District, Hurand District, Ahar County, East Azerbaijan Province, Iran. At the 2006 census, its population was 31, in 7 families.

References 

Populated places in Ahar County